Bob Bradley (born 5 February 1974) is a British music composer, producer and songwriter. He is mostly known for producing Above & Beyond's acoustic albums as well as soundtracks, themes and incidental music for film, television and advertising.

Career

Bradley started his career as a duet with his brother Peter Bradley Junior who later formed alternative band, Subcircus. They were mentored by the Everly Brothers in their early teens. Bradley later joined the Bristol-based art rock collective the Blue Aeroplanes. After departing from the Blue Aeroplanes, he joined indie darlings The House of Love and recorded an EP with Guy Chadwick under the name the Madonnas.

In 1997, Bradley signed with the newly formed V2 Records with a project called 'Lovebabies'. They released their debut single 'Explore' in the same year. A follow up single was released in early 1998, "Blue Earth Angel", featuring remixes from Attica Blues, Morcheeba and DJ Pulse. A full-length album was recorded under the title "For The Realization of Zion".

Bradley became one of the original members of the UK production house Xenomania with whom he amassed a long list of pop credits, working with artists such as Sugababes, Girls Aloud, Natalie Imbruglia and Gabriella Cilmi. In 2012, Bradley produced and arranged Above & Beyond's Acoustic album. He brought in singers Alex Vargas and Annie Drury and was also joined by regular contributor Zoë Johnston for the project. The album spawned a succession of live concerts starting at London's Porchester Hall and Los Angeles' Greek Theatre, where they were joined on stage by EDM pioneer Skrillex. The performances were described by Billboard magazine as "one of the finest and more memorable shows in EDM history".

As of 2021, Bob has been working on his own material, developing talent and new projects with Yungblud, Jeff Beck, Ozzy Osbourne & Johnny Depp under his given name Robert Edward Bradley.

Personal life
Bob Bradley was born on 5 February 1974 in Teesside, England. He now resides in Whitby and Leeds

Selected works

Co-written/produced/played

Written or worked with 
Brian Higgins - Cher, Kylie Minogue, Texas
 Eg White - Will Young, Adele, James Morrison
Steve Lee - Britney Spears, Will Young
 Hayden Bell - The Veronicas, Savage Garden
Tim Powell - Girls Aloud, Sugababes
Nick Coler - Sugababes, Franz Ferdinand, The KLF
Tony McGuinness - Above & Beyond, Madonna
Q - Depeche Mode, Bomb the Bass
Francis Rossi - Status Quo
Mike Pelanconi - Lily Allen, Sinéad O'Connor
Chris James - Craig David
Niara Scarlett - Mutya Buena, Sugababes

Awards

References

External links
 Discogs
 Billboard.com
 Huffington Post
 Le Grand Magistery
  Xenomania Discography

1974 births
Living people
English male composers
English songwriters
English record producers
English male guitarists
Male bass guitarists
English male singers
Mixing engineers
Xenomania
21st-century English bass guitarists